Aminul Haque (1921–2011) was a Bangladeshi actor, known for his role in Mukh O Mukhosh, the first Bengali-language feature film to be made in East Pakistan.

Filmography
 Mandir
 Mukh O Mukhosh (1956)
 Akash Ar Mati (1959)
 Tomar Amar (1961)
 Jowar Elo (1962)
 Godhulir Prem (1965)
 Aporajeyo (1967)
 Epar Opar (1975)
 Achena Atithi (1978)
 Nazma (1983)
 Chapa Dangar Bou (1986)
 Rabeya (2008) as Emdad Kazi's uncle

Honours
Haque was awarded the Ekushey Padak in 1991 for his contributions to drama.

References

1921 births
2011 deaths
Bangladeshi male film actors
Pakistani male actors
Recipients of the Ekushey Padak in arts
20th-century Bangladeshi male actors
 Male actors from Kolkata